Signal to Noise  may refer to:

Science and technology
 Signal-to-noise ratio, a measure used in science and engineering to quantify how much a signal has been corrupted by noise
 Signal-to-noise ratio (imaging), this measure specifically in the field of imaging.

Literature
 Signal to Noise (comics), a 1992 graphic novel written by Neil Gaiman and illustrated by Dave McKean
 Signal to Noise, a 1998 cyberpunk novel by Eric S. Nylund
 Signal to Noise (1997 novel), a 1997 cyberpunk novel by Carla Sinclair
 Signal to Noise (Moreno-Garcia novel), a 2015 fantasy novel by Silvia Moreno-Garcia

Music
 Signal to Noise (The Rise album), a 2002 album by the band The Rise
 Signal to Noise (White Willow album), a 2006 album by the Norwegian art-rock band White Willow
 Signal to Noise, a 2015 album by Andy Jackson
 "Signal to Noise", a song from Peter Gabriel’s 2002 album Up
 "Signal to Noise", a song included as a B-side from The Cure's single "Cut Here"

See also
 "S2N", a song on the album Distance over Time from the progressive metal band Dream Theater
 S/n (disambiguation)